The Schwarzer Graben is a river of Saxony, Germany.

The lower course of the Schwarzer Graben is called Weinske; it is a left tributary of the Elbe, which it joins near Dommitzsch.

See also
List of rivers of Saxony

References

Rivers of Saxony
Rivers of Germany